Alexander M. Puzrin (born 24 July 1965) is professor of geotechnical engineering at ETH Zurich, Switzerland, working in the field of geomechanics.

Biography
Alexander Puzrin completed his undergraduate studies in Structural Engineering in 1987 at the Department of Civil Engineering, Moscow Institute of Civil Engineering, USSR, and received his PhD in Geotechnical Engineering in 1997 from the Department of Civil Engineering, Technion – Israel Institute of Technology, Haifa, Israel. From 1997 to 2001 he was Lecturer, Senior Lecturer and then tenured associate professor at the same institution, and from 2002 to 2004 a tenured associate professor at the Department of Civil and Environmental Engineering, Georgia Tech, Atlanta, United States. Since 2004 he is Full Professor of Geotechnical Engineering at ETH Zurich, Switzerland.

Research
The focus of Puzrin's research is on constitutive modeling of geomaterials and on the analysis of progressive and catastrophic failure in soils, with applications to creeping terrestrial and tsunamigenic submarine landslides. His interests include applications of novel sensor technologies to geotechnical monitoring and the development of innovative chemical and biological soil-improvement techniques. He has been involved as an expert and consultant in large-scale geotechnical projects in the UK, the US, Russia, Mexico, Azerbaijan, Israel and Switzerland. He is a co-founder of the ETH Zurich spin-off company Marmota Engineering AG.

Awards
Alexander Puzrin's papers were awarded by the British Institution of Civil Engineers with Geotechnical Research Medals in 2004 and 2013, the George Stephenson Medal in 2013, and the David Hislop Award in 2018. In 2019, he received the Geomaterials Research Medal of the Alliance of Laboratories in Europe for Education, Research and Technology (ALERT). In addition, he served as the Editor of the international journal Géotechnique from 2012 to 2015. Since 2014, he is a Fellow of the Institution of Civil Engineers.  He was a recipient of the ETH Zurich Excellence in Teaching Award in 2009 and 2013.

References

External links
Group homepage

Geotechnical engineers
Academic staff of ETH Zurich
Fellows of the Institution of Civil Engineers
Swiss engineers
Living people
1965 births